Longview was a cannery town on the South Coast of British Columbia, Canada, located near Langdale and Port Mellon on the west, mainland side of Thornbrough Channel, a side-channel of Howe Sound separating Gambier Island from the mainland Sunshine Coast. Another cannery town on the same bit of coast was just south, at Seaside Park.

See also
List of canneries in British Columbia

References

website

Populated places in the Sunshine Coast Regional District
Company towns in Canada
Ghost towns in British Columbia
Unincorporated settlements in British Columbia